Sir William Cornwallis of Brome (c. 1549– 13 November 1611) was an English courtier and politician.

Life
He was the eldest son of Sir Thomas Cornwallis, Comptroller of the Household to Queen Mary, and his wife Anne Jerningham. He became a courtier at around age 21, spent heavily to secure position there, and married by 1578, Lucy Neville.

Despite a family connection to Thomas Cecil, Cornwallis made little enough progress at court, and twice withdrew without regard for the loss of royal favour. When James I came to the throne he fared no better, and retired from public life in 1605.

Cornwallis spent freely, and entertained the Queen at his house in Highgate. He was knighted, by 1594. At the Union of the Crowns, in June 1603 he rode to Northamptonshire to meet Anne of Denmark and her children.

He laid on a performance by his friend Ben Jonson at Highgate in 1604, for James I. He employed the composer Thomas Watson and other musical and literary men.

Cornwallis died on 13 November 1611.

Family
Cornwallis married, first, Lucy Neville, daughter of John Neville, 4th Baron Latimer and Lucy Somerset. After her death, he married Jane Mewtas. She was a lady in waiting to Anne of Denmark and as a wedding gift the queen gave her a jewel studded with diamonds made by George Heriot. The Cornwallis family lived at Brome Hall near Diss in Norfolk.

Frederick Cornwallis, 1st Baron Cornwallis was the third son, and eldest surviving son, of Sir William, a son of his second marriage.

Of the daughters:

Frances married Sir Edmund Withypole.
In 1630 she married Richard Lumley, 1st Viscount Lumley of Waterford.
Cornelia married Sir Richard Fermor of Somerton.
Anne in 1609 married Archibald Campbell, 7th Earl of Argyll.

The History of Parliament, on the other hand, gives his father as John Cornwallis of Earl Soham. Sir William Cornwallis, the essayist, was a nephew who is sometimes described as "the younger" to differentiate him from this William Cornwallis, who is often described as "the elder".

Notes

Members of the pre-1707 English Parliament for constituencies in Cornwall
1611 deaths
People from Brome, Suffolk